The WWE Raw Women's Championship is a women's professional wrestling world championship created and promoted by the American professional wrestling promotion WWE on the Raw brand. It was introduced as the WWE Women's Championship on April 3, 2016, at WrestleMania 32 to replace the WWE Divas Championship and has a unique title history separate from the original WWE Women's Championship. As a result of the 2016 WWE draft, the championship became exclusive to Raw with a subsequent rename and SmackDown created the SmackDown Women's Championship as a counterpart title.

The championship is generally contested in professional wrestling matches, in which participants execute scripted finishes rather than contend in direct competition. During the 2021 WWE Draft, previous champion Charlotte Flair was drafted by SmackDown, while Becky Lynch, who held the SmackDown Women's Championship, was drafted by Raw. On the October 22, 2021 episode of SmackDown, the night that draft results took effect, Lynch and Flair exchanged titles by order of WWE official Sonya Deville to keep the championships on their respective brands. Bianca Belair is the current champion in her first reign. She won the title by defeating Becky Lynch during Night 1 of WrestleMania 38 on April 2, 2022, in Arlington, Texas.

Charlotte Flair, then known simply as Charlotte, was the inaugural champion, having won the title at WrestleMania 32, and she also has the most reigns at six. Lynch's first reign is the longest at 373 days (398 days as recognized by WWE), while Flair's fifth reign is the shortest at one day. Lynch also has the longest combined reign at 535 days (560 days as recognized by WWE). Asuka is the oldest champion at age 38, while Sasha Banks is the youngest, having won the title at 24 years, 181 days old.

Title history

Names

Reigns

Combined reigns 

See also 
 List of current champions in WWE
 Women's championships in WWE
 Women in WWE

References

External links 
 Official Raw Women's Title History

WWE championships lists
WWE Raw
WWE women's championships
Women's professional wrestling championships lists